Shonentai 35th Anniversary Best is the second compilation album by Japanese idol group Shonentai. It was released on 12 December 2020, the day of their 35th anniversary, under Johnny's Entertainment Record. The album release was announced on the same day as an announcement from the withdrawal from group and agency of two members – Nishikiori and Uekusa, as there are no future plans for the group.

Background
It is their first album release since 1999's studio album Prism and their first compilation album in 32 years. In November 2020, they've changed their visual profile image on their official website page for the first time in 12 years.

The compilation album was released in two types: a regular edition and a limited edition, available only for the fanclub members. Both of the editions share the same track list on the Disc 1 and Disc 2.

Regular edition of the album includes 3 CDs of the biggest hits from their career such as Kamen Budokai, Kimi Dake ni and several picks up from B-Side and albums, with a total of 39 tracks.

The limited edition includes a total of 12 discs – the first half of them includes CD discs and the second half includes DVD discs. Discs from number 3–5 includes renewed versions of their old hits, previously unreleased tapes and musical records from the musical stages. Discs from number 6 to 12 includes live tour and music video clip collection digitalised into the DVD format, for the first time since its original release – VHS.

Charting
The album reached on daily charts number 1 in first week with 12,000 copies sold. and reached on weekly charts on number 4 with total 18,480 sold copies.

Track listing

Disc 1

Disc 2

Disc 3

Usage in media
Kanji dane...Dela was promoted as a commercial song for Meiji Cholocate brand DELA
Stripe Blue was promoted as a theme song to the fashion building "Harajuku Idol Wonderland" during its first open
Kimi Dake Ni was promoted as a theme song to the movie Nineteen, starred by all three members themselves
LADY was broadcast as an anime television series Lady!!
Silent Dancer was promoted as a commercial song to the watch brand Seiko
Oh! was broadcast as theme song to the television series The Chef, starred by Higashiyama himself
Wangan Skier was broadcast as an image song to the 1998 Winter Olympics on Fuji TV
Ai to Chinmoku was broadcast as a theme song to the television drama series Harmonia Kono Ai no Hate

References

2020 compilation albums
Japanese-language compilation albums